The cuisine of Tuvalu, a state in the Central Pacific (Oceania), is based on the staple of coconut and the many species of fish found in the ocean and the lagoons of the atolls of Tuvalu. Pulaka, (cyrtosperma merkusii), or swamp taro, is an important source of carbohydrates. Rice now forms an important part of the diet. Coconut is used in different forms with coconut water, coconut milk and the flesh of the coconut being used to flavour dishes. Various desserts made on the islands include coconut and coconut milk, instead of animal milk.

Traditional foods of Tuvalu
The traditional foods eaten in Tuvalu are pulaka, which is a "swamp crop" similar to taro, but "with bigger leaves and larger, coarser roots", bananas, breadfruit and coconut. Tuvaluans also eat seafood, including coconut crab, fish from the lagoon and ocean, seabirds (taketake or black noddy and akiaki or white tern) and also pork.

Seafood provides protein. Bananas and breadfruit are supplemental crops. Coconut is used for its juice, to make other beverages (such as toddy) and to improve the taste of some dishes. Pork is eaten mostly at fateles (or parties with dancing to celebrate special events).

Agriculture in Tuvalu is focused on coconut trees and growing pulaka in large pits of composted soil below the water table, Pulaka is the main source for carbohydrates. Pulaka makes up the bulk of the islanders' traditional diet; it is usually supplemented by fish. Since the unprocessed corms are toxic, they must always be cooked, usually in an earth oven. Many of the recipes call for the addition of coconut cream or toddy, or both. On Niutao, coconut cream (lolo) is poured over beaten pulp of pulaka, to make a dish called tulolo. A similar dish on Nukufetau, with halved corms, is called tulolo pulaka; with beaten corms the dish is called fakapapa. Fekei is made on all the islands, and consists of pulaka which is grated (typically this is woman's work) with the aid of limestone with holes drilled in it. The resulting pulp is wrapped in pulaka leaves and steamed, and mixed with coconut cream.

Influences on the cuisine of Tuvalu
Because these islands are isolated, the neighbors' influences are not felt in the Tuvaluan cuisine. Because Tuvalu was a British colony during the 19th century, the Tuvalu cuisine includes British elements and meals with the local flavors.

The pulaka pits are at risk from increasing sea levels, which increase saltwater levels subsoil in the atolls and islands of Tuvalu. Besides rising saltwater levels, "changing lifestyles and eating habits" also threaten the cultivation of the crop, a process that began during and after World War II, when American occupying troops supplied the islands with imported foods and many pulaka pits were no longer maintained. Imported foods are often high in sugar, leading also to an increase in the need for dental care.

The Tuvaluans benefited from the canned food supplied by the American forces, although the change in diet continued after the war, which resulted in long term impacts on health. Tuvaluans adopted a diet that includes high levels of corned beef, rice and sugar. This food is consumed even when fish and traditional vegetables are available. This diet is believed to contribute to increasing levels of diabetes, hypertension and other cardiovascular diseases among Tuvaluans.

Variations in diet
The diets on Tuvalu's nine widely-spread islands varies, but they are all based on seafood, fish meals and local plants, such as taro. Most of the population is concentrated on the Funafuti Island and even though this is very small, the cuisine there is most representative for all the state. In the capital, Funafuti, the seafood dishes and meats are more common than the mashed vegetables or soups, while in outer islands, the taro is the staple aliment and it is considered to be multi-functional: there is the taro leaf and coconut soup, taro leaf au gratin, taro chips, taro cakes and palusami - all these are meals that can be found in Hawaii, too. The palusami, also called the samoa is a dish which is served with taro or breadfruit and it is made of taro leaves (which can be replaced with spinach), coconut cream, lime juice, onions and spices.

References

External links